Dilli Raj Sharma is a Nepalese politician. He was elected to the Pratinidhi Sabha in the 1999 election on behalf of the Nepali Congress.

References

Living people
Year of birth missing (living people)
Nepali Congress politicians from Gandaki Province
Nepal MPs 1999–2002